Kevin Visser (born 19 July 1988) is a Dutch professional footballer who plays for AFC as a midfielder. He formerly played for ADO Den Haag, Helmond Sport and Volendam.

Career

ADO Den Haag
As a youth, Visser played for Vitesse Delft, Delfia, DHC Delft, TONEGIDO, RKC Waalwijk and ADO Den Haag.

Visser made his debut in professional football on 15 August 2010 in a match for ADO against Roda JC. He scored his first senior goal in a match against De Graafschap in September 2010 after having come on as a substitute.

Helmond Sport
On 21 May 2013, Visser signed a three-year contract with Eerste Divisie club Helmond Sport. Upon signing, he stated that he had chosen to move to a club from the second division in order to develop as a player. He made his debut on 2 August in a 2–2 away draw against Excelsior.

Visser scored his first goals for Helmond Sport on 7 November 2014 – a hat-trick – in a 5–2 league win over Telstar.

Volendam
Visser signed a two-year contract with FC Volendam in June 2016. On 5 August, he made his debut for the club in the league game against Almere City. On 9 December, he scored his first goal in a 6–0 away win over Achilles '29.

During his time at the club, Visser grew into team captain and a fixed value in central midfield.

Visser suffered a serious knee injury during a team practice in July 2020, sidelining him for more than a year. On 6 August 2021, he made his official comeback, coming on as a substitute in the 61st minute of a 2–2 league draw against FC Eindhoven for Calvin Twigt.

AFC
On 2 May 2022, Visser agreed to join third-tier AFC for the 2022–23 season.

Career statistics

References

External links
 Voetbal International profile 
 

1988 births
Living people
Footballers from Delft
Dutch footballers
Association football midfielders
VSV TONEGIDO players
ADO Den Haag players
Helmond Sport players
FC Volendam players
Amsterdamsche FC players
Eredivisie players
Eerste Divisie players